

H

Ha

He

Hi

Ho

Hu

I

J

Ja

Je

Ji

Jo

Je

K

L

La

Le

Li

Lo

Lu

M

Ma

Me

Mi

Mo

Mu

N

Na

Ne

Ni

O

References

External links
Schlumberger Oilfield Glossary

Underwater diving terminology
Underwater diving
Wikipedia glossaries using description lists